Sergei Pavlovich Anisimov (born 9 February 1990) is a Russian former professional footballer.

Club career
He made his debut in the Russian Premier League in 2008 for FC Shinnik Yaroslavl.

References

1990 births
People from Kolpashevsky District
Living people
Russian footballers
FC Shinnik Yaroslavl players
Russian Premier League players
FC Spartak Kostroma players
Association football midfielders
FC Znamya Truda Orekhovo-Zuyevo players
FC Mashuk-KMV Pyatigorsk players
Sportspeople from Tomsk Oblast